August Ferdinand Kuwert (15 October 1828, Nidden – 14 August 1894, Wernsdorf, südl. von Königsberg) was a German  entomologist who specialised in Coleoptera.

He was a  Rittergutsbesitzer (owner of an estate or Junker) near the Prussian town of Wernsberg. Kuwert described many new species of Passalidae, Cleridae, Helophoridae, Hydrophilidae, Hydraenidae, Elmidae, Heteroceridae and Dryopidae.

Works
Partial list
1891 Systematische Uebersicht der Passaliden-Arten und Gattungen. Deutsche Entomologische Zeitschrift I:161-192.
1897 Die Passaliden Dichotomisch Bearbeitet, die Arten. Nov. Zool. 4:274-306

References
Anonym 1894 [Kuwert, A. F.] Insektenbörse, Stuttgart 11 : 191-192		
Anonym 1894 [Kuwert, A. F.] Leopoldina Halle 30 : 207

External links
Nekrolog
 Coleoptera Poloniae Kuwert publications list via browser

German entomologists
1828 births
1894 deaths